Brian Patrick Mullen (born March 16, 1962) is an American former professional ice hockey player who spent eleven seasons in the National Hockey League (NHL) playing for the Winnipeg Jets, New York Rangers, San Jose Sharks, and New York Islanders. Mullen appeared in 832 career NHL games, recording 260 goals and 622 points, along with 30 playoff points in 62 postseason games.

Amateur career
Mullen grew up in an Irish-American family in the Hell's Kitchen neighborhood of Manhattan, New York.  He and older brother Joe Mullen played roller hockey in the streets of Manhattan as children. After landing a job as a  stick boy for the New York Rangers, he and Joe were offered a spot on a junior league team coached by Ranger head coach Emile Francis.

Mullen won an athletic scholarship to the University of Wisconsin–Madison where he played under legendary college hockey coach "Badger" Bob Johnson.

Professional career

Mullen was selected in the seventh round of the 1980 NHL Entry Draft by the Winnipeg Jets.  Two years later, he signed with the Jets and scored an impressive 24 goals and recorded 50 points during his rookie season.  He spent five seasons with Winnipeg before joining his hometown New York Rangers where he spent four seasons. Mullen also represented the United States in the 1989 and 1991 Ice Hockey World Championship tournaments after the Rangers were knocked out in the first round of the Stanley Cup playoffs (he was also a member of the 1984 Canada Cup team). Mullen spent the 1991–1992 season with the Sharks and the following season with the Islanders.

On August 9, 1993, Mullen suffered a small stroke caused by a blood clot in his brain.  The stroke severely impacted his motor skills and he required open heart surgery.  Mullen was recovering well and his reflexes largely returned to normal.  He hoped to one day return to action in the NHL but a subsequent seizure in 1994 ended his dreams of a comeback and he was forced to retire from hockey.

Post career

After his retirement, he worked for the NHL front office for eight years.  He also worked as a radio color analyst for the New York Rangers alongside play-by-play announcer Kenny Albert for the 2002-2003 and 2003–2004 seasons.  He is currently a youth hockey coach with the Protec Ducks of the New Jersey Youth Hockey League (NJYHL) who skate out of Protec Hockey Ponds in Somerset, New Jersey.

Awards and accomplishments
Played in NHL All-Star Game (1989)
Lester Patrick Trophy (1995)
 In the 2009 book 100 Ranger Greats, was ranked No. 89 all-time of the 901 New York Rangers who had played during the team's first 82 seasons

Career statistics

Regular season and playoffs

International

References

External links

Brian Mullen @ hockeydraftcentral.com

1962 births
Living people
American men's ice hockey left wingers
Ice hockey players from New York (state)
Lester Patrick Trophy recipients
National Hockey League All-Stars
New York Islanders players
New York Rangers players
People from Hell's Kitchen, Manhattan
San Jose Sharks players
Sportspeople from Manhattan
Winnipeg Jets (1979–1996) draft picks
Winnipeg Jets (1979–1996) players
Wisconsin Badgers men's ice hockey players
American people of Irish descent
NCAA men's ice hockey national champions